Sean Andrew McGinty (born 11 August 1993) is a professional footballer who plays as a defender for Scottish club Ayr United, who he also captains. After a spell with Charlton Athletic as a junior, he began his professional career with Manchester United. Having failed to break into the United first team, he had loan spells at Morecambe, Oxford United, Carlisle United and Tranmere Rovers before signing for Sheffield United on a permanent basis. He had loan spells at Northampton Town and Rochdale, signing permanently for the latter at the end of his only season in Sheffield. He then spent time on loan at FC Halifax Town and Aldershot Town before again making the move permanent. In June 2016, he signed for Torquay United, where he spent two seasons before moving to Scottish club Partick Thistle. In 2020, he would leave to join Greenock Morton for a season. In the summer of 2021, McGinty signed a two-year deal with Ayr United, following his previous manager David Hopkin.

Born in Maidstone, Kent, he played internationally for the Republic of Ireland at under-17, under-19 and under-21 level.

Club career

Manchester United
McGinty spent three years in the youth setup at Charlton Athletic before moving to Manchester United in July 2009. He progressed through the youth academy and was part of the side that won the 2010–11 FA Youth Cup, before signing a pro contract in the summer of 2011. On 27 February 2012, McGinty signed for Football League Two side Morecambe on an initial loan until 31 March, with an option to extend. He made his debut the next day in a 2–1 defeat to Dagenham & Redbridge at the Globe Arena. On 12 March 2012, McGinty returned to Manchester United after he dislocated his shoulder in the match against Hereford United.

McGinty moved to Oxford United on a six-month loan on 17 July 2012. Although the loan did not officially go through until 4 August, he went straight into Oxford's team for their pre-season matches. He made his first-team debut for Oxford, playing at left back, in a 3–0 defeat to Leeds United in the second round of the League Cup. On 13 September 2012, McGinty's loan to Oxford United was terminated and he returned to Manchester United.

On 6 November 2012, McGinty joined Carlisle United on loan until 4 December 2012, before Carlisle United extended his loan until 5 January 2013. He returned to Manchester United at the end of the loan, but was again sent out on loan to Tranmere Rovers on the emergency loan deadline day on 28 March 2013. On his release from the Red Devils, McGinty stated "I made a few stupid mistakes along the way at Manchester United. I was young but I believe the only way you do learn is by making mistakes. I have learned from them and that's water under the bridge now. I know what happened and I will never make those mistakes again. I believe they have made me a stronger person and I will be a better player because of it."

Sheffield United
On 25 June 2013, McGinty signed for League One club Sheffield United on a two-year contract with the option of a third year, and made his professional début for Sheffield United on 17 August 2013 against Colchester United at Bramall Lane in a 1–1 draw. McGinty was unable to break into the first team on a regular basis however, making only three appearances for the club during the first half of the 2013–14 season. Following the arrival of new manager Nigel Clough in October, McGinty's chances appeared to be further limited and in January 2014, he joined Northampton Town on loan. McGinty spent a month at Northampton, making two appearances for the Cobblers before returning to Bramall Lane at the start of February. On 23 March 2014, McGinty joined Rochdale on loan for the rest of the season, where he played once before returning to Bramall Lane. McGinty was released by Sheffield United on 16 May 2014.

Rochdale
On 20 May 2014, McGinty signed a one-year deal with former loan club Rochdale.

On 11 November 2014, McGinty signed for Halifax Town on a month-long loan, after struggling to make the Rochdale first team. He was released by Rochdale at the end of the season.

Aldershot Town
On 20 February 2015, McGinty joined Conference Premier side Aldershot Town on an initial one-month loan, which was then extended until the end of the season. Following his successful loan from February to April 2015, he signed a one-year contract with the club.

Torquay United
On 21 June 2016, preceding his release from Aldershot Town, McGinty joined fellow National League side Torquay United.

Partick Thistle
On 18 June 2018, McGinty was signed by Scottish Championship club Partick Thistle on a two-year deal. McGinty became a favourite with the Thistle fans, known for his passionate celebrations and connection with the supporters. He was named club captain in August 2019. McGinty left Thistle in January 2020, after making 64 appearances for the club.

Greenock Morton
On 28 January 2020, McGinty signed for fellow Championship club Greenock Morton, on a contract until the end of the season.

Ayr United 
On 27 May 2021, McGinty signed for fellow Championship club Ayr United, following his ex-manager at Morton David Hopkin to the club.

Career statistics

References

External links

1993 births
Living people
Sportspeople from Maidstone
English people of Irish descent
English footballers
Association football defenders
Manchester United F.C. players
Morecambe F.C. players
Oxford United F.C. players
Carlisle United F.C. players
Tranmere Rovers F.C. players
Sheffield United F.C. players
Northampton Town F.C. players
Rochdale A.F.C. players
FC Halifax Town players
Aldershot Town F.C. players
Torquay United F.C. players
English Football League players
Republic of Ireland association footballers
Republic of Ireland youth international footballers
Republic of Ireland under-21 international footballers
Partick Thistle F.C. players
Scottish Professional Football League players
Greenock Morton F.C. players
Ayr United F.C. players